Fakhar Zaman may refer to:
 Fakhar Zaman (cricketer), Pakistani international cricketer
 Fakhar Zaman (poet), Pakistani Urdu poet
 Fakhar Zaman Khan, Pakistani politician